The members of the DuBois family — Tom (husband), Sarah (wife), and Jazmine (daughter) — are fictional characters and featured players in Aaron McGruder's Boondocks comic strip and animated TV series. They live across the street from the main characters, the Freeman family — Robert and his grandsons, Huey and Riley.

Tom

Thomas Lancaster DuBois, a mild-mannered rich black man, is an assistant district attorney and close friend of Robert Freeman. Tom, being non-confrontational and edgy by nature, adheres strictly to the law, particularly due to his irrational fear of being sent to prison and anally raped. This fear originated when Tom was revealed at a very young age to a TV series that depicted a violent prison rape. The fear developed to such a degree that Tom refused to participate in even the slightest of legal infractions (even those that are not banned by a prison sentence) as a youth and throughout adulthood. His job as a prosecuting attorney is ironic: He essentially sends other people (mostly black men) to the fate he himself most fears, and he seems to feel guilty about it. Tom is eventually forced to confront his phobia in the third-season episode A Date With the Booty Warrior, where he comes face to face with a rapist named the "Booty Warrior" after being trapped in a prison washroom during a riot. Tom seemingly conquers his fear after beating the would-be rapist unconscious with a bar of soap (after he slipped and fell on his back), and also mentions to Sarah that he plans on becoming a public defender in order to save young men from being violated in prison.

Tom's political ideologies are more towards American liberalism and as a result he is a Democrat. Tom's love for his political ideologies are marked by an incident where he kidnaps Ralph Nader during the 2004 presidential election, who he believes is a threat that could stunt the Democratic vote.

Tom's hobbies include singing and playing the piano, and he once dreamed of becoming a successful recording artist, he also sang a longer version of Usher's song "Burn" and made a parody of the music video, but was later made more realistic when it was interrupted by a moving car, as well as Sarah asking him if he was doing that "Music Video thing" again. He also played basketball on his Ivy League college team at Princeton University but, as Sarah points out, he was mostly a benchwarmer.  He is depicted as somewhat of a goober and a wet blanket in social situations, since he seems unable to really lighten up.

He and his wife are active members of the NAACP and demonstrate a strong understanding of the struggles of black people much as Huey does. Huey is more proactive and confrontational in his approach and generally questions to what degree the NAACP helps black people. Furthermore, Huey views Tom as part of the white power structure that he detests (i.e., part of the "system"), however, he does show Tom respect as an elder. Riley's interactions with Tom are few and far between, and (like most adults Riley encounters) he does not respect him. This leaves him prone to clash with Tom in many of the same ways he clashes with his own grandfather.

Tom was also temporarily possessed by the spirit of Colonel H. Stinkmeaner.

Sarah

Sarah DuBois is the least prevalent character from the DuBois family, though she becomes more prominent in the third season of the TV series. She, like her husband, is liberal and fiercely political. She focuses her efforts on political action against the conservative parties. She is extremely usual about her interracial marriage, even going so far as to joke about it when Tom is mocked and attacked for it. Sarah is a member of the NAACP and a self-proclaimed "crusader for black rights." She and Tom have also clashed over her support for Ralph Nader. There have been unknown references to Sarah regretting marrying Tom, mostly because of Tom's fear of going to jail and getting raped has caused both of them to miss out a lot in life. Sarah is revealed to be much more frisky and lowkey than Tom, which leads to strains on their relationship (such as when he refused to lighten up and have a little extra wine on their anniversary due to his prison rape phobia). She is hinted to be somewhat sexually frustrated. She fantasizes about strong, successful black men like Barack Obama and Usher, but still shows much love and concern for her husband.

Jazmine

Jazmine DuBois is a naïve and innocent 10-year-old biracial girl, which, to her chagrin, occasionally makes her an object of ridicule for Huey and Riley. She is the most prominent child in the series other than the Freeman boys, and was a central character in Season 1.

Though Huey takes pleasure in criticizing her both subtly and conspicuously, he has also shown a enthusiasm to empathize with her and tends to avoid being mean just for the sake of it. Most of the time, when he berates her, it is his way of dealing with her ignorance and naïveté in what could be construed as an unnecessarily cruel way to try to enlighten her. Though such attempts usually fail, he remains patient and tolerant. For her part, Jazmine appears to be a kind friend to Huey, as when she applauds enthusiastically for Huey's unchanged "Black Jesus" play—unlike his grandfather and Riley, who fall asleep. When Jazmine starts a lemonade stand in "The Block Is Hot" and later gets exploited by Ed Wuncler Sr., Huey rallies up protesters in hopes to liberate her. In the end when the stand burns down and it begins to snow, he shares his scarf with her. In the nationwide outbreak during "The Fried Chicken Flu," Jazmine is the only person Huey allows into his home other than his immediate family in the episode.

In the comic strip, Jazmine has trouble accepting the fact that she is multiracial, wanting her hair to be straight instead of puffy and Afro-like. She was a regularly featured character in the comic strip until 2001, when the strip took a more political focus upon which she was inexplicably absent until the later years of the strip. During that time, Jazmine was replaced by Michael Caesar as the prominent character other than Huey and Riley Freeman. She returned to the comic strip in 2004, explaining that she had been so afraid of terrorism that she hid in her room for two years.

She appears to be quite attached to her father, crying for fear that he was kidnapped by terrorists when he does not come back from work in "A Date with the Health Inspector." The notable exception to this is during the episode "Tom, Sarah and Usher," when she wishes that Usher was her father instead (although this sentiment quickly passes).

Jazmine seems to mistake Santa Claus for Jesus Christ. This is an example of McGruder satirizing the unseen effects that parents lying to children can have, as well as a possible reference to Linus and The Great Pumpkin of Peanuts, which McGruder admires.

References

The Boondocks characters
Animated human characters
Child characters in animation
Child characters in comics
Comics characters introduced in 1999
Fictional activists
Fictional African-American people
Fictional American lawyers
Fictional assistant district attorneys
Fictional characters from Maryland
Fictional defense attorneys
Fictional Democrats (United States)
Fictional European-American people
Fictional families